Murrays Fall is a waterfall on the Essequibo River, Guyana, approximately 55 km south of the confluence with the Rupununi River.

It is 3 km. downstream from the Trinity Rapids, and is the first river obstacle on the Essequibo from Apoteri.

References 

Waterfalls of Guyana